The following buildings in Jacksonville, Florida were added to the National Register of Historic Places as part of a Multiple Property Submission under the name San Jose Estates Thematic Resource Area (or TR).

References

External links

 Duval County listings at National Register of Historic Places

Buildings and structures in Jacksonville, Florida
History of Jacksonville, Florida
National Register of Historic Places in Jacksonville, Florida
National Register of Historic Places Multiple Property Submissions in Florida